Historical documents are original documents that contain important historical information about a person, place, or event and can thus serve as primary sources as important ingredients of the historical methodology.

Significant historical documents can be deeds, laws, accounts of battles (often given by the victors or persons sharing their viewpoint), or the exploits of the powerful. Though these documents are of historical interest, they do not detail the daily lives of ordinary people, or the way society functioned. Anthropologists, historians and archeologists generally are more interested in documents that describe the day-to-day lives of ordinary people, indicating what they ate, their interaction with other members of their households and social groups, and their states of mind. It is this information that allows them to try to understand and describe the way society was functioning at any particular time in history. Greek ostraka provide good examples of historical documents from "among the common people".

Many documents that are produced today, such as personal letters, pictures, contracts, newspapers, and medical records, would be considered valuable historical documents in the future. However most of these will be lost in the future since they are either printed on ordinary paper which has a limited lifespan, or even stored in digital formats, then lost track over time.

Some companies and government entities are attempting to increase the number of documents that will survive the passage of time, by taking into account the preservation issues, and either printing documents in a manner that would increase the likelihood of them surviving indefinitely, or placing selected documents in time capsules or other special storage environments.

See also 
 Historical source
 Archive
 Diplomatics
 Aultrus

External links
Internet History Sourcebooks Project See also Internet History Sourcebooks Project. Collections of public domain and copy-permitted historical texts presented cleanly (without advertising or excessive layout) for educational use.
American Historical Documents from the Harvard Classics Collection
Some of America's historical documents from the NARA
French Renaissance Paleography Scholarly maintained website containing over 100 French manuscripts from 1300 to 1700 with tools to decipher and transcribe them.
French historical documents search engine

References

Documents